Víctor Guaglianone (born 24 September 1936) is a Uruguayan former footballer. He played in eight matches for the Uruguay national team from 1959 to 1960. He was also part of Uruguay's squad for the 1959 South American Championship that took place in Argentina.

Career statistics

International

Scores and results list Uruguay's goal tally first, score column indicates score after each Guaglianone goal.

Honours
Uruguay
South American Championship: 1959

References

External links
 

1936 births
Living people
Uruguayan footballers
Uruguay international footballers
Place of birth missing (living people)
Association football forwards
Montevideo Wanderers F.C. players
S.S. Lazio players
Club Nacional de Football players
Danubio F.C. players
Atlético Bucaramanga footballers
Colón F.C. players
Uruguayan expatriate footballers
Expatriate footballers in Italy
Expatriate footballers in Ecuador
Expatriate footballers in Venezuela